This article lists some of the events that took place in Belgium in 2006.

Incumbents
Monarch: Albert II
Prime Minister: Guy Verhofstadt

Events
 22 to 26 March – 2006 World University Cycling Championship takes place in Antwerp/Herentals: The Netherlands wins the overall medal table. Ellen van Dijk is the best cyclist with 1 gold and 1 silver medal.
 12 April – Murder of Joe Van Holsbeeck
 9 September – 50th Gordon Bennett Cup held in Waasmunster.
 8 October – Provincial and municipal elections

Deaths
 27 March – Madeleine Scrève (born 1912), fencer
 3 April – Michel Delire (born 1933), footballer
 12 April – Joe Van Holsbeeck, teenage murder victim
 14 June – Jean Roba (born 1930), comics author
 29 June – Philibert Mees (born 1929), composer and pianist
 4 July – Norbert Kerckhove (born 1932), cyclist
 6 July – Piet Van Brabant (born 1932), journalist
 5 August – Hugo Schiltz (born 1927), politician
 16 August – Julien Schepens (born 1935), cyclist
 4 September – Rémy Belvaux (born 1966), film maker
 6 October – Louis Van Schill (born 1921), cyclist
 25 November – Jules Deneumoulin (born 1910), canoeist 
 8 December – Albert De Coninck (born 1915), communist
 30 December – Renaat Bosschaert (born 1938), artist

See also
2006 in Belgian television

References

 
Belgium
Years of the 21st century in Belgium
2000s in Belgium
Belgium